Latiaxis naskensis is a species of sea snail, a marine gastropod mollusk, in the family Muricidae, the murex snails or rock snails.

References

naskensis
Gastropods described in 1992